Morton Howison Smith (December 11, 1923 – November 12, 2017) was an American Presbyterian minister. He was the first Stated Clerk of the Presbyterian Church in America, serving from 1973 to 1988, and also served as its Moderator in 2000.

Smith had degrees from the University of Michigan, Columbia Theological Seminary and the Free University of Amsterdam. He supported racial segregation, even authoring articles against interracial marriage saying "any scheme of mass integration of the races is decidedly unscriptural." There is no record Smith's views changed.

He taught at Belhaven College and Reformed Theological Seminary before becoming Stated Clerk of the General Assembly of the Presbyterian Church in America. Smith continued to serve as Professor of Systematic and Biblical Theology at Greenville Presbyterian Theological Seminary in his retirement.

In 2004, a Festschrift was published in his honor. Confessing our Hope: Essays Celebrating the Life and Ministry of Morton H. Smith included contributions from J. Ligon Duncan III and George W. Knight III.

References

1923 births
2017 deaths
University of Michigan alumni
Columbia Theological Seminary alumni
Vrije Universiteit Amsterdam alumni
American Presbyterian ministers
American expatriates in the Netherlands